Glen A. Sherwood (born May 7, 1934) is an American politician in the state of Minnesota. He served in the Minnesota House of Representatives.

References

1934 births
Living people
Democratic Party members of the Minnesota House of Representatives